Fernande Giroux (died May 20, 1994) was a Canadian actress and jazz singer. She was most noted for winning the Canadian Film Award for Best Supporting Actress at the 22nd Canadian Film Awards for her performance in the film Red. Her other major acting roles were as Monique Wingate in the television series Moment of Truth, and Madame Gagnon in the television miniseries The Newcomers.

As a singer, she was known primarily for cabaret performances in the Montreal area, and appearances on Quebec television variety shows.

References

External links

1994 deaths
20th-century Canadian actresses
Canadian film actresses
Canadian television actresses
Canadian jazz singers
Actresses from Montreal
Singers from Montreal
French Quebecers
Best Supporting Actress Genie and Canadian Screen Award winners
20th-century Canadian women singers